The St. Anthony of Padua Church is the name given to Catholic church located in Saül, in French Guiana, a dependent territory of France in northern South America. The building is listed as a historic monument since 1993.

His patron saint as its name suggests is St. Anthony of Padua, also known as St. Anthony of Lisbon, a priest of the Franciscan Order, Portuguese preacher and theologian.

Construction of the church began in 1952 and was completed in 1962. The village of Saül was then the center of gold mining in French Guiana. The building is now considered the most important testimony of this era. Around the church, is developing the locality, later to be elevated to municipality.

The construction was performed based on a simple design that is reminiscent of the colonial era in North America. A ship with two uniforms bell towers were added in the front.

See also
Roman Catholicism in French Guiana
St. Anthony of Padua Church (disambiguation)

References

Roman Catholic churches in French Guiana
Saül, French Guiana
Roman Catholic churches completed in 1962
20th-century Roman Catholic church buildings in France